Der schlimm-heilige Vitalis (The Evil-holy Vitalis) is a 1962 comic opera by Richard Flury. It is based on the fifth of the  novella cycle by Gottfried Keller published 1872.

A woman falls in love with a monk, Vitalis, and persuades him to leave the order and marry her.

References

German-language operas
Operas based on novels
1962 operas
Operas
Adaptations of works by Gottfried Keller